The Thickety is a horror fantasy children’s fiction book series, written by American author J. A. White.

Series 
The first book, A Path Begins, was published on May 6, 2014. In 2015, the book won the CNN Children's Choice Award for Debut Author. The second book, The Whispering Trees, was published March 10, 2015. The third book, Well of Witches, was published on February 23, 2016. The fourth and final book, The Last Spell, was published April 4, 2017.

Plot 
The story follows a pair of siblings named Kara and Taff who are mistreated by villagers due to their dead mother having practiced witchcraft. One day, Kara discovers a book with magical powers, which is the catalyst to her path down a new, dark road. J. A. White has three sons and teaches kids language arts at a school.

References

American horror novels
American young adult novels
American fantasy novels
American novel series
Halloween novels